Libertas Business College was founded in 2004 with the aim of educating and preparing students for the challenging environment of the global economy. The educational programme , currently attended 600 students, is designed in accordance with the Bologna Declaration.

See also
List of universities and colleges in Croatia

References

Universities and colleges in Croatia
Education in Zagreb